Townsend Bell (born April 19, 1975) is an American professional motor racing driver competing in the IMSA WeatherTech SportsCar Championship, and also as a motorsports commentator for NBC Sports’ IndyCar Series coverage.

Early career
He spent time in karting, Skip Barber, Formula Dodge and the Barber Dodge Pro Series before graduating to Indy Lights in 2000. He won the Indy Lights championship in 2001 and earned two starts in a Champ Car in a joint effort between Patrick Racing and Dale Coyne Racing as a test for a full-time seat in 2002.  He earned Roberto Moreno's seat at Patrick that year. He raced a partial season and scored a best finish of fourth at Portland.

International Formula 3000 career
His efforts shifted to Europe and in 2003 he was teammate to series champion Björn Wirdheim in International F3000 competition.  Bell was the first American to score a F3000 podium with a 3rd place at the Hungaroring and he finished 9th overall in a field covered with future Formula One talent – Giorgio Pantano, Patrick Friesacher, Vitantonio Liuzzi and Nicolas Kiesa among them.

His performance in F3000 led to Formula One tests with the Jaguar and BAR Honda F1 teams.

Return to IndyCar

Despite earning a test with British American Racing at year's end, Bell returned to America where he replaced Mark Taylor for Panther Racing in the Indy Racing League IndyCar Series midway through 2004, and posted a best finish of fifth. He started one race as an injury replacement for Tomáš Enge in the same car in 2005. He made his first Indianapolis 500 appearance for Vision Racing in 2006, qualifying 15th and finishing 22nd. He returned to the IndyCar Series in 2008 driving the No. 23 car in events where Milka Duno was not scheduled to race. His best result in 2008 was an eighth-place finish at Richmond International Raceway in June. He also was entered in a third team car in the Indy 500, where he qualified twelfth and finished tenth.

In 2009, KV Racing Technology entered Bell in the Indy 500.  Bell was on a limited-month schedule but had an impressive race day, advancing from 24th on the grid up to the top five. Passing Team Penske's Will Power on the last restart, Bell impressed with a fourth-place finish.

Bell posted his best Indianapolis 500 qualifying effort to date in 2011, racing for Sam Schmidt Motorsports. By qualifying fourth fastest, he started the 95th running of the Greatest Spectacle in Racing on the inside of the second row.

Bell finished 9th in the 2012 Indianapolis 500 with Sam Schmidt Motorsports. His 2014 Indianapolis 500, back with KV Racing Technology in the No. 6 Robert Graham Dallara-Chevrolet, marked his eighth start in the event and seventh consecutive.

He qualified 4th and led 12 laps in the 2016 Indy 500, racing for Andretti Autosport, before an incident on pit road during caution. He finished 21st.

Bell is a color commentator for NBC Sports with lead anchor Leigh Diffey and fellow analyst Paul Tracy. Hobbs and Steve Matchett, analysts for NBC Sports’ Formula 1 coverage, occasionally rotate if Bell is on assignment.

Sports car career
Bell made his sports car debut in 2012 and won the 12 Hours of Sebring on debut with Alex Job Racing. That season, he drove a Lotus Evora GTE for Alex Job Racing in the American Le Mans Series with Bill Sweedler, before he and Sweedler drove a Ferrari F458 Italia the following year with West/AJR.

He matched his Sebring feat in his first Rolex 24 at Daytona start in 2014, winning that driving with Level 5 Motorsports. Bell and Sweedler won the Tequila Patron North American Endurance Cup with AIM Autosport, after finishing first or second in three of the four races in the endurance series within the TUDOR United SportsCar Championship. The pairing finished fourth overall in the full season GT Daytona class points.

In 2015, Bell and co-driver Bill Sweedler took home the IMSA GT Daytona Championship. In addition, they had a dominant win at VIR and podium finishes in the 12 Hours of Sebring and 24 Hours of LeMans.

In 2016, Bell along with teammates Jeff Segal and Bill Sweedler won the 24 Hours of LeMans in only their second try.

In the famous Indy500 in 2016 Townsend clocked a top speed of 241.637 mph.

He is competed full-time in the 2017 WeatherTech SportsCar Championship GT Daytona class with Alex Job Racing in an Audi R8 GT3 and returned to Le Mans with Ferrari in 2017.

Most recently, Bell has competed in the AIM Vasser-Sullivan Lexus RC F GT3 for the 2019 & 2020 GTD class seasons.

Television
Bell is a color commentator for NBC Sports with lead anchor Leigh Diffey and fellow analyst James Hinchcliffe.

Bell has filled in for Formula One coverage on NBC, most notably in 2016 when he replaced Will Buxton, who was on bereavement leave for the races at Sepang and Mexico City.

Bell is also a color commentator for NBC Sports's IndyCar, Global RallyCross Championship as well as the host of What'Cha Got on Fox Sports 1.

Bell has also both competed and commented in the Stadium Super Trucks.

At the 2013 X-Games in Munich, Bell competed in Global Rallycross and finished 6th in the final.

Racing record

American open–wheel racing results
(key) (Races in bold indicate pole position; races in italics indicate fastest lap.)

Barber Dodge Pro Series

Indy Lights

CART

IndyCar Series

 1 Run on same day.
 2 Non-points race.
 3 The Las Vegas Indy 300 was abandoned after Dan Wheldon died from injuries sustained in a 15-car crash on lap 11.

Indianapolis 500

Complete International Formula 3000 results
(key)

24 Hours of Le Mans results

Complete WeatherTech SportsCar Championship results
(key) (Races in bold indicate pole position; results in italics indicate fastest lap)

References

External links
 Townsend Bell Interview
 IndyCar Driver Page

 http://townsendbell.com/

1975 births
Living people
Champ Car drivers
IndyCar Series drivers
Indianapolis 500 drivers
Indy Lights champions
Indy Lights drivers
International Formula 3000 drivers
Racing drivers from San Francisco
American Le Mans Series drivers
24 Hours of Daytona drivers
24 Hours of Le Mans drivers
Barber Pro Series drivers
WeatherTech SportsCar Championship drivers
Stadium Super Trucks drivers
Global RallyCross Championship drivers
Arden International drivers
Arrow McLaren SP drivers
Panther Racing drivers
Vision Racing drivers
Dreyer & Reinbold Racing drivers
KV Racing Technology drivers
Andretti Autosport drivers
Level 5 Motorsports drivers